Ministry of General Administration is a former Ministry of Government of Nepal to regulate and manage the civil service as prescribed governments rules and regulations in the country. In February 2018, this ministry is merged with Ministry of Federal Affairs and named Ministry of Federal Affairs and General Administration.

References

General Administration